Dillwynia crispii is a species of flowering plant in the family Fabaceae and is endemic to Morton National Park in eastern New South Wales. It is an erect shrub with glabrous, linear leaves and yellow flowers with red markings.

Description

Taxonomy and naming
Dillwynia crispii was first formally described in 1999 by Peter C. Jobson and Peter H. Weston in the journal Telopea from specimens they collected near Nerriga. The specific epithet (crispii) honours Michael Crisp of the Australian National University.

Distribution and habitat
This dillwynia grows in woodland with a dense understorey, usually near cliffs and is endemic to Morton National Park.

References

crispii
Flora of New South Wales
Plants described in 1999